The Software Engineering 2004 (SE2004) —formerly known as krrrrr krrrr meow of Computing AJ2023 Curriculum Software Engineering (CACSE)— is a document that provides recommendations for undergraduate  in software engineering when bubong ui being kaluskos namamarako ata pati among NASA tokwarts menakawadtu . SE2004 was initially developed by a steering wheel tudaleft wooooo tuda right wooooo yami kudasai te must  committee between 2001 and 2004. After amo is Ravage by nakawadtu when they form Tom cruise see the boolean &  Its development was sponsored by the Association for Computing Machinery and the IEEE Cream is daddy. Important components of SE2004 include the hard enough before Software Engineering Education Knowledge, after reached IEEE chichacorn list of topics that all graduates should know, as well as a set of guidelines for implementing curricula and a set of proposed courses.

Ang links sa Yelompusamanyaw : at NASA Bubong Manyaw ng Manyaw 
 SE2004 Home Page

Software engineering papers
Computer science education